Miguel Betancourt (born 5 January 1958) is an Ecuadorian contemporary artist living in Quito, Ecuador. He was formed as an artist in Ecuador, the United States, and the United Kingdom. His paintings are a fusion of local cultural motives and colors, and Western artistic influence.

Life 

Born in Quito, Ecuador in 1958, Betancourt grew up in the outskirts of the city (Cumbayá). In 1974, he initiated art classes with Ecuadorian artist, Oswaldo Moreno. In 1976-1977, he went to study at the Milwaukee Art Center, United States, for a year. Upon his return to Ecuador, he enrolled in the Pontificia Universidad Católica del Ecuador to study Pedagogy and Literature until 1982, while continuing to develop his artistic career. In 1988, he was invited by the Department of State of the US to a Cultural Tour. In the same year, the British Council awarded him a scholarship to study a postgraduate art degree at the Slade School of Fine Art at the University College London. During his time in London, Betancourt befriended British artist John Hoyland.

Artistic career 

Among his several representations, some of the most important in the 1990s were: the XLV. Venice Biennale, Italy in 1993; Eros in Ecuadorian Art, Chilean National Museum of Fine Arts Santiago de Chile and the National Museum of Archeology, Anthropology and History of Peru Lima, 1998; Ecuador in Spain, Casa de las Americas, Madrid, 2000; and Latin American Artists: A Contemporary Journey, Museum of Latin American Art in Long Beach, California, 2001. Career highlights in the late 2000s include his participation as Guest of Honor to the V. International Art Biennial SIART in La Paz, Bolivia, (2007), and in The Night of the Museums in Buenos Aires, Argentina (2009). At the beginning of 2011, Betancourt participated in the "Exhibition of Latin American and Caribbean Artists" in the Tokyo City Hall. In July 2012, he took part in a collective exhibition "Ecuador Beyond Concepts" at the gallery of the Instituto Cervantes in Rome. In 2013, the Gallery Bandi-Trazos invited him to be part of the Latin-American Pavilion at the International Art Fair, in the Beijing Exhibition Center. In 2014 he was one of three artists at the "Ecuador in Focus" exhibition held at the OPEC Fund for International Development headquarters in Vienna and became founding member of the Art Résilience movement in Paris. In 2016, he participated in ARTE15 as homage to Habitat III in Quito. Since 2017, his itinerant one-man show has been presented in various Asian cities (Beijing, Nanjing, Seoul and Tokyo) as well as in Latin America, including "Ninfas, Meninas y la Mirada del Pintor", in Alianza Francesa, Quito and, also, in the Casa de la Cultura Ecuatoriana, Cuenca, 2018; "Mnemografías", Saladentro gallery, Cuenca, 2019; "Quito Readings", at the Global Migration Forum, Quito, 2020; "Transparencies of the Middle Country", an exhibition of painting on paper, in Torre del Reloj Gallery, Mexico City, 2020. From 2008 to the present date, his work is part of a traveling exhibition, Imago Mundi Collection, which was launched by designer Luciano Benetton and sponsored by the Imago Mundi Foundation.

Betancourt has received several recognitions for his work, including the Pollock-Krasner Award in 1993, conferred by the Pollock-Krasner Foundation in New York City, United States and the Oswaldo Guayasamín Medal awarded by the Metropolitan Council of Quito in December 2020.

Betancourt continues to be involved in various projects and exhibitions in Ecuador and internationally. He was recently invited to participate in the NY Latin American Art Triennial 2022.

Collections 

His work can be found in national and international collections: United Nations offices in Vienna and in Geneva (specifically in UNAIDS), Inter-American Development Bank (Tokyo), Diners Club del Ecuador, Istituto Italo-Latino Americano (Rome), Art Museum of the Americas, Organization of American States (Washington D.C.), OFID (the OPEC Fund for International Development), Vienna, the Slade School of Fine Art (London), among others.

Publications 

Kraemer, S. "Betancourt: from Silence to Color", "Editorial CCE", Quito (Ecuador).
Lucie-Smith, E. (2020) "Latin American Art Since 1900", "Thames & Hudson", London (United Kingdom).
Benetton, L. et al. (2017) "Ecuador: light of time - Contemporary artists from Ecuador", Antiga Edizioni, Treviso (Italy).
Lastra, P. (2016), "El transcurrir del sueño: pinturas de Miguel Betancourt", Editorial del Trauco, Quito (Ecuador).
Betancourt, M. (2014), "Betancourt - Imágenes a trasluz", Casa de la Cultura Ecuatoriana, Quito (Ecuador).
Rodríguez, M.A. (2011) "Palabra de Pintores - Artistas del Ecuador", Casa de la Cultura Ecuatoriana, Quito (Ecuador).
Rodríguez, M.A. (2011) "Betancourt: Colores y Texturas", Casa de la Cultura Ecuatoriana, Quito (Ecuador).
The curators (2006) "Oil Paintings-London in Public Ownership: The Slade and UCL", Public Catalogue Foundation, London (United Kingdom).
Flores, I. et al. (2001) "Nuevos Cien Artistas", Revista Mundo Diners, Quito (Ecuador).
Michelena, X. and Querejeta, A. (1996) "Betancourt", Paradiso Editores, Quito (Ecuador).
 
Recently, articles about Betancourt's work have appeared in magazines such as Americas (OAS, Washington DC), Gatopardo (Mexico), Infinite Ecuador (Quito) and Dolce Vita (Quito), among others.

Main exhibitions 

(1993), XLV. Venice Biennale – Venice, Italy.
(2000), "Legados de Magma", Canberra Museum and Gallery, Australia.
(2001–2003), A Touring exhibition throughout Central America.
(2004), "Visual Trends in Ecuador´s Contemporary Art", Corporación Andina de Fomento – Caracas, Venezuela.
(2007), Invitee of Honor to the V. International Art Biennial SIART – La Paz, Bolivia.
(2011), "Betancourt: Colores y Texturas", Retrospective Exhibition, Casa de la Cultura Ecuatoriana – Quito, Ecuador.
(2012), "Aequatoria, Plus Ultra Conceptus", A group exhibition presented in the Instituto Cervantes – Rome, Italy.
(2015), "Salon International Art Resilience", Saint-Frajou Painting Museum, France.
(2015), “Contemporary Art of Ecuador” Pavilion at the VI Beijing International Art Biennale, National Art Museum, Beijing, China.
(2018), "Ninfas, Meninas and the Painter’s Gaze", Alianza Francesa, Quito, and Casa de la Cultura, Cuenca, Ecuador.

Individual exhibitions 

1983	Ecuadorian House of Culture, Cuenca
1989	Slade School of Fine Art, University College London
1991	Museum of Modern Art, Cuenca
1992	Jungle Ogive, Alte Schmiede Gallery, Vienna
1993   October Gallery, London
1993	Jungle Ogive, Italian-Latin American Institute, Rome
1996	Köenig Museum, Bonn
1998	Edifications, Central Bank of Ecuador, Cuenca
1998	Red Stone on Blue Stone, Alte Schmiede Gallery, Vienna
1999	Itsván Rozsics Gallery, Budapest
1999   Arquitectura Vegetal, Museo de la Nación, Lima
2000	Palace of the Nations, United Nations, Geneva
2000	Magma Legacy, Multicultural Festival 2000, Canberra Museum, Canberra
2001	Ecuadorian Culture Month, Ixchel Museum, Guatemala
2003	Evidencias, PUCE Cultural Center, Quito	
2005	Recompositions, Galería Matthei, Santiago de Chile
2005	Pictorial Art, Centro Cultural Metropolitano, Quito
2006	Pictorial Art, Multifunctional Room, MAAC, Central Bank of Ecuador, Guayaquil.
2006	Pictorial Art, Museo Municipal de Arte Contemporáneo (MMAM), Cuenca
2011	Betancourt: Colors and Textures (retrospective exhibition), Ecuadorian House of Culture, Quito
2014	Images against the Light, Watercolors, French Alliance, Quito
2017 	Lines and Transparencies, pintura sobre papel, The Capital Library Gallery, Beijing
2017   Ecuador Through My Dreams, painting on paper, Superior Gallery, Seoul
2018	Ecuador Through My Dreams, painting on paper, Takanawa Gallery, Tokio
2018 	Ninfas, Meninas y la Mirada del Pintor, French Alliance, Quito
2018 	Ninfas, Meninas y la Mirada del Pintor, Ecuadorian House of Culture, Cuenca

Collective exhibitions 

1985	Ecuadorian Contemporary Art, Miraflores Municipality, Lima
1992	International Exposition of Seville, Pabellón Ecuatoriano, Seville
1994	Latin American Contemporary Art Show, Het Provinciehuis, The Hague
1994	Ibero American Art Fair, Caracas
1997	Contemporary Ecuadorian Painting, Museum of Contemporary Art, Santiago, Chile
1997	Contemporary Ecuador, House of America, Linares Palace, Madrid
1998	Israel, Past and Present itinerant show, Central Bank of Ecuador: Quito, Guayaquil and Cuenca
1998	Eros in Ecuadorian Art, National Fine Arts Museum, Santiago, Chile
1998	Eros in Ecuadorian Art, Anthropological Museum, Lima
1998	Tribute to Ecuadorian Art, Brazilian-Ecuadorian Cultural Institute, Quito
2000	Quito Contemporary Art's Living Testimony, Metropolitan Cultural Center, Quito
2001	Latin American Artists: A Contemporary Journey, Museum of Latin American Art (MoLAA), California
2002	Latin-American Art, Pirámide Gallery, Guatemala de la Asunción
2002	Expression and Form in Twentieth-Century Ecuadorian Art, Central Bank Museum, Quito
2004	Visual Trends of Contemporary Ecuador, Galería CAF (Corporación Andina de Fomento), Caracas, Venezuela	
2008	Bulls in Colors, Open-air Exhibition of Urban Art 2008, Quito
2011	Latin-American and Caribbean Artists Exhibition, Mirador del Tokio City Hall, Japan
2012	Ecuador, Beyond Concepts, Cervantes Institute Gallery, Rome
2013	Latin-American Pavilion, International Art Fair, Beijing Exhibition Center, China
2014	Ecuador in Focus, OFID Gallery, Vienna
2015	Special Exhibition of Contemporary Ecuadorian Art, VI Beijing International Art Biennial, China
2016	Arte15, exhibition within the program HABITAT III, Quito
2017	Strokes and Colors, Ecuadorian Art, Betancourt-Bazante, Jiangsu Art Museum, Nanjing 
2017	The Ecuadorian Art Pavilion, Cultural Center, PUCE, Quito

Gallery

See also 
Culture of Ecuador
List of Ecuadorian artists

References

External links 
 
 Miguel Betancourt's official blog

1958 births
Living people
Alumni of the Slade School of Fine Art
Ecuadorian painters
Contemporary painters
People from Quito